Eubranchus prietoi is a species of sea slug or nudibranch, a marine gastropod mollusc in the family Eubranchidae.

Distribution
This species was described from Verdicio, Asturias, Spain, in the NE Atlantic Ocean. It has been reported from Arcachon Bay, France and Senegal as well as Ghana.

Biology
Eubranchus prietoi was found with the hydroid Plumularia setacea, which is presumed to be its food. It lays short egg coils across the midrib of the hydroid.

References

Eubranchidae
Gastropods described in 1981